Jerzy Radziwiłowicz (born 8 September 1950) is a Polish film actor. He is a graduate of the National Academy of Dramatic Art in Warsaw. He has appeared in 37 films since 1974.

Selected filmography
 Man of Marble (1977)
 Man of Iron (1981)
 Le Grand Paysage d'Alexis Droeven (1981)
 Passion (1982)
 Dies rigorose Leben (1983)
 The Possessed (1988)
 The Seventh Chamber (1995)
 An Air So Pure (1997)
 Secret Defense (1998)
 Life as a Fatal Sexually Transmitted Disease (2000)
 The Story of Marie and Julien (2003)
 Aftermath (2012)

References

External links
 

1950 births
Living people
Male actors from Warsaw
Polish male film actors
Chevaliers of the Ordre des Arts et des Lettres
Recipients of the Silver Medal for Merit to Culture – Gloria Artis
Recipients of the Silver Cross of Merit (Poland)
Knights of the Order of Polonia Restituta